This is a list of singles that have peaked in the Top 10 of the Billboard Hot 100 during 1968.

Aretha Franklin scored five top ten hits during the year with "Chain of Fools", "(Sweet Sweet Baby) Since You've Been Gone", "Think", "The House That Jack Built", and "I Say a Little Prayer", the most among all other artists.

Top-ten singles

† — "Hey Jude" also made its Hot 100 debut on September 14.

1967 peaks

1969 peaks

See also
 1968 in music
 List of Hot 100 number-one singles of 1968 (U.S.)
 Billboard Year-End Hot 100 singles of 1968

References

General sources

Joel Whitburn Presents the Billboard Hot 100 Charts: The Sixties
Additional information obtained can be verified within Billboard's online archive services and print editions of the magazine.

1968
United States Hot 100 Top 10